Joe Keating (24 January 1922 – 10 June 2000) was an  Australian rules footballer who played with St Kilda in the Victorian Football League (VFL).

Notes

External links 

1922 births
2000 deaths
Australian rules footballers from Victoria (Australia)
St Kilda Football Club players
Maryborough Football Club players